Börele is a rural locality (a posyolok) in Biektaw District, Tatarstan. The population was 98 as of 2010.

Geography 
Börele is located 11 km north of Biektaw, district's administrative centre, and 32 km northeast of Qazan, republic's capital, by road.

History 
The village was established in 1930s.

After the creation of districts in Tatar ASSR (Tatarstan) in Biektaw (1930s–1963),  Yäşel Üzän (1963–1965) and Biektaw districts.

References

External links 
 

Rural localities in Vysokogorsky District